Honour Sabre of the Awakened Lion was an honour sabre of the Republic of China. It was created in 1935 for awarding already-highly decorated officers who are deserving of more commendation. The honour sabre was the highest honour in the military of the Republic of China. As the order was never awarded since its creation, the honor was abolished by the Executive Yuan on October 19, 2017.

References

Orders, decorations, and medals of the Republic of China
Chinese swords
Awards established in 1935
Honorary weapons